Annie Gariepy (born May 12, 1975 in Bromont, Québec) is a female member of the Canadian cycling team and has cycled for the American team auto trader. Gariepy was the only Canadian on the team with her team mates included Sarah Ulmer, Susie Pryde, Kim Smith and WFP Shuster.  she left Team Autotrader  at the beginning of 2002 when she passed over to team trek more.

Gariepy underwent a complete rebuilding of the knee in May 2001 and that it had carried out a return to the competition at the Great female Price of Quebec in August 2001. She won a bronze for Women's 24 km Points Race  at the 1998 Commonwealth Games.

References

External links 
 Veloptium.net

1975 births
Living people
Canadian female cyclists
Cyclists at the 1998 Commonwealth Games
Commonwealth Games medallists in cycling
Commonwealth Games bronze medallists for Canada
Medallists at the 1998 Commonwealth Games